Cyamella is a genus of trilobites. It was originally described by Robert M. Owens in 1978, as "Cyamops", a junior homonym of the fly genus Cyamops, but was renamed in 1990.

References

Proetida genera
Ordovician trilobites of Europe